John Joseph Carroll DD (23 December 1865 — 8 May 1949) was an Irish born priest who served as Bishop of the Roman Catholic Diocese of Lismore in Australia, for 39 years.

Carroll was born in Bresnor, Piltown, Co. Kilkenny, Ireland, in 1865.  He was educated at Mount Melleray Abbey Seminary Co. Waterford, and St. Patrick's, Carlow Diocesan College(1886-1890), and was ordained a priest on 31 May 1890, immediately going to Australia and serving in the Archdiocese of Sydney for 20 years.  He was consecrated as the second Bishop of Lismore, New South Wales, by Cardinal Moran on 6 March 1910, succeeding another Irish man Bishop Jeremiah Doyle.  The future Cardinal Norman Thomas Gilroy served Bishop Carroll as his secretary from 1930 to 1934.

Carroll invited the Marist Fathers from New Zealand to build and staff a college for boys, St. John’s College, Woodlawn, just outside Lismore, which was opened in 1931 and named after Saint John the Evangelist. Initially an agricultural college, it is now a secondary school.

Bishop Carroll, still nominally Bishop of Lismore, died in semi-retirement in Brisbane, on 8 May 1949.  1949.

References

1865 births
1939 deaths
People from County Kilkenny
Alumni of Carlow College
20th-century Roman Catholic bishops in Australia
Roman Catholic bishops of Lismore